Allentown is an unincorporated community in Accomack County, Virginia.

References

Unincorporated communities in Accomack County, Virginia